The Opel Rekord Series B is an executive car that was introduced in August 1965, by Opel as a replacement for the Opel Rekord Series A. The Rekord B shared the wheelbase and 1696mm width of its predecessor, but the front and rear panels were restyled in order effectively to differentiate the new model. The big news was under the bonnet/hood, however.

Previous Rekords were noteworthy for combining eye-catching new bodies with a robust four cylinder engine that dated back to 1937. By the 1960s the old engine was perceived as outdated in terms of refinement and sophistication, and with the Rekord B it was replaced. Unlike previous Rekords, the Rekord B featured completely new four cylinder engines, now with a camshaft integrated into the cylinder head. The units were still not conventional ohc engines since the camshaft was physically located lower than the tops of the cylinder valves. The configuration had been developed by General Motors in Detroit and was known as the Camshaft in Head (CIH) configuration. The new engines gave the Rekord B a useful performance boost across a range of four cylinder engines which now came in three different sizes, and allowed for the possibility of increased torque, especially as the engine was developed further during the later 1960s, 1970s and 1980s.

The Rekord B was the first Opel Rekord to offer, on the 1900 S version, the option of fully automatic transmission.

Production ended after less than a year in July 1966 ahead of the annual summer plant shut-down.

A stopgap solution
The Rekord B can be seen as a crossover model and an emergency response: Opel had originally intended to launch their all new generation of four cylinder engines in an all new Opel Rekord, but as the scheduled launch date approached it became clear that while the new engines would be ready for a 1965 launch, other key elements for the new models would not. With the marketing department and dealers geared up for a new model, the decision was therefore taken to present the new engines in what was essentially the old body, albeit with certain styling cues that adumbrated the new model that in the event would appear a year later. The Rekord B therefore featured the (then highly unusual) rectangular headlights that would be a feature of the 1966 Rekord C, as well as similar patterns of exterior chrome decoration. At the back the traditional rectangular light groupings of the Rekord A were, for the Rekord B, replaced with four bold round light units similar to those planned for the forthcoming Opel GT. The interior design and even the colour and trim options were only mildly modified for the Rekord B. Rekord Bs rolled down the Rüsselsheim production lines for rather less than a year between late Summer 1965 and mid Summer 1966. When, in August 1966, the plant restarted after the vacation shut down, the Rekord B had been replaced by the Rekord C.

The body
The relatively extensive range of body types followed the pattern of the predecessor model. Top seller was the saloon/sedan, available with either 2 or 4 doors. There was a "CarAVan" station wagon, but still only with 3 doors which was normal in Germany, although by now station wagons of this size produced in France, Italy, England or Sweden almost invariably came with a second set of doors for the passengers in the back. Opel also offered a three-door delivery van which was essentially identical to the station wagon except that the rear side windows were replaced with metal panels. In addition, a factory built coupé was again offered.

The brakes
All models now came with disc brakes at the front and drum brakes at the back, controlled using a dual circuit system and brake booster. This was a progression from the situation with the Rekord A, in respect of which only had servoassisted discbrakes, not the rear drums. Discbrakes on Rekord A was standard on coupe and 4-door De Luxe, and option on sedan during 1965.

Engines

Four cylinders
For the Rekord B the manufacturer introduced a new generation of four cylinder engines to replace the robust but by now technically outdated engine first seen in the 1937 Opel Olympia. Several manufacturers replaced pre-war side-valve engines with new overhead camshaft engines during this decade, and the new Opel also carried its camshaft directly above the cylinders. This did away with the old rods and rocker linkage that had been a feature of the old engines. However, instead of operating directly on the cylinder valves, the camshaft still operated the valves using rocker arms because the camshaft itself was positioned too low above the cylinders to permit direct action from the camshaft on the valves. One reason for this may have been cosmetic. Other automakers such as BMW with their 1500 launched in 1962 and Volkswagen with their NSU designed K70 (which finally made it to the showrooms in 1970) squeezed vital centimeters off the height of the engine unit by canting it over at an eccentric angle in the engine bay. Opel's so-called Camshaft in Head (CIH) engine configuration similarly enabled a succession of Opels to feature the low bonnet/hood lines that style-conscious product development departments favoured. The camshaft on the new Opel engine was chain driven, which also represented a change from the 1930s design philosophy implicit in the directly cogwheel driven camshaft included in earlier generations of Opel Rekord.

The four cylinder engine introduced with the Rekord B came in three sizes: 1492cc, 1698cc and 1897cc. The three engines features the same 69.8 mm stroke length, but the bore varied from 82.5 to 93.0. Claimed power output ranged between 60 hp (44 kW) on the smallest engine and 90 hp (66 kW). The 1492cc engine still accepted "normal" grade petrol, but the larger two engines, with higher compression ratios, both required higher octane fuels. The 1492cc engine still came with a traditional "manual" choke, while the larger engines both came with a "semi-automatic" choke. The "Carter licensed" carburetor that had been fitted to the old four cylinder engines was now replaced by bought in Solex and Zenith carburetors.

The new four-cylinder engine range self-evidently had plenty of scope for further development, and continued to power Opel Rekords until the model's 1986 demise.

Six cylinders
Unlike the four cylinder Rekord B, there was nothing new about the engine fitted in the six cylinder top-end model. This was the 2605cc unit already seen in the Rekord-A L6, and which with these dimensions had first appeared in the 1959 Opel Kapitän. However, the basic design of this unit went back to the 1937 Opel Super Six. The 1959 upgrade had left this unit with a claimed 100 hp (74 kW) of horsepower which should have provided a useful performance boost over the fastest of the new four cylinder powered Rekords. The six cylinder Rekord B was indeed the fastest in the range, but only by a small margin: much of the extra power was needed to cope with the extra weight of the engine which also, as with the Rekord A, made the steering very heavy in urban traffic. As before, the manufacturer reserved power assisted steering for their luxury models, the Opels Admiral and Kapitän.

Transmission
The standard transmission package for the saloon/sedan and estate/station wagon bodied Rekord Bs featured a manual all-synchromesh gearbox, controlled by a column mounted lever. Customers could choose between three or four forward speeds.

Coupé buyers found the four speed manual transmission, but controlled using a centrally positioned floor mounted gear lever, included in the price.

The big news on transmission was the option, for the first time on a Rekord, of fully automatic transmission. This was restricted to buyers of cars fitted with the largest four cylinder engine, known as the "1900S". The transmission fitted was a General Motors Powerglide system, well known in North America for more than a decade. The system was simple and durable, but had been designed for use with the larger engines and there were only two forward speeds. Using it in a four-cylinder Opel gave rise to a noticeable performance deficit.

As before, the option of an "Olymat" automatic clutch provided by Fichel & Sachs was offered to buyers specifying the three speed transmission. The system was similar to the Fichel & Sachs "Saxomat" automatic clutch available at this time from several German automakers.

Opel Olympia
Earlier models had carried the name "Opel Olympia Rekord", and although this had been shortened to "Opel Rekord" in 1959, Opel retained an attachment to the Olympia name. The Body and 1492cc engine of the Opel Rekord B also featured in a cut price model badged as the "Opel Olympia". This came with only a basic specification, along with the smallest of the Rekord engines and a three speed transmission. Although the "Olympia" name would reappear on a smaller Kadett based car, this was the last time Opel used the "Olympia" name in connection with an Opel Rekord. It was a sign of rising prosperity and rising equipment levels that the 1966 Rekord based Opel Olympia was the last Opel for which it was necessary to pay extra if you wanted your car fitted with a heater.

Commercial
At launch the entry level 1492cc two door Rekord came with a domestic market manufacturer's recommended price of DM 6,980. At the other end of the range a factory built Rekord coupé L-6, powered by the six cylinder 2,605cc engine borrowed from the Kapitän, could be purchased for DM 9,570. Power assisted brakes were available for an extra DM 95, which was also the cost for specifying a four speed gear box in place of the standard three speed transmission. Rekord 1900S customers wishing to specify and pay for the GM Power-gilde two speed automatic transmission were required to find an extra DM 950.

The Rekord B was produced between 1965 and 1966 for approximately ten months. During this period 296,627 were produced As before, the nearest competitor in terms of price, size, power and target market came from Ford. A new Ford Taunus 17M was introduced in 1964 and during a three-year production run would chalk up a total of 710,059 units. The Opel Rekord would never challenge the smaller cheaper Volkswagen Beetle for top slot in the West German sales charts, but the success of the Rekord B and its successors ensured that the Rekord's sales chart dominance in its own class was never again threatened by Ford Germany or anyone else.

Technical data

See also
 Opel Rekord
 Opel Commodore

Sources
Werner Oswald: Deutsche Autos 1945–1975. Motorbuch Verlag, Stuttgart 1975, S. 88–93

External links 

 Opel Rekord B: Lückenbüßer und Wegbereiter - Artikel bei SPIEGEL-ONLINE

Rekord B
Sedans
Station wagons
Executive cars
Rear-wheel-drive vehicles
Cars introduced in 1965